Orothalassodes is a genus of moths in the family Geometridae.  Members of the genus are found primarily in Southeast Asia.

Species 
 Orothalassodes absimilis (Warren)
 Orothalassodes aptifimbria (Prout)
 Orothalassodes curiosa (Swinhoe, 1902)
 Orothalassodes falsaria (Prout, 1912)
 Orothalassodes floccosa (Prout, 1917)
 Orothalassodes glabrosa Holloway, 1996
 Orothalassodes hypocrites (Prout, 1912)
 Orothalassodes leucoceraea (Prout, 1925)
 Orothalassodes leucospilota (Moore)
 Orothalassodes luculentus (Inoue, 2006)
 Orothalassodes masuii (Inoue, 2006)
 Orothalassodes mirificus (Inoue, 2006)
 Orothalassodes pantascia (West, 1930)
 Orothalassodes pervulgatus (Inoue, 2005)
 Orothalassodes philippinus (Inoue, 2006)
 Orothalassodes retaka (Holloway, 1996)
 Orothalassodes simplex (Warren)
 Orothalassodes vivida (Prout)

References
Natural History Museum Lepidoptera genus database

Hemitheini